William Huddleston may refer to:
William Huddleston (colonial administrator) (1826–1894), acting governor of Madras, 1881
Yusef Lateef born William Emanuel Huddleston (1920–2013), American jazz multi-instrumentalist and composer
William Huddleston (MP) (died 1628), English Member of Parliament
William Huddleston (reverend), father of Amelia Edith Huddleston Barr